Nan'goma Cave (or Nandembo) is a cave system located in Kipatimu and Kibata ward of Kilwa District in Lindi Region of Tanzania.

With 7510m of surveyed underground passages, it is the longest cave in Tanzania.

References

Caves of Tanzania